Giani Liviu Negoiţă (born 8 May 1977) is a Romanian former professional footballer who played for teams such as Petrolul Ploiești, Astra Ploiești and FC Argeș Pitești, among others.

External links
 
 
 

1977 births
Living people
Sportspeople from Brașov
Romanian footballers
Association football midfielders
Liga I players
Liga II players
FC Petrolul Ploiești players
FC Astra Giurgiu players
FC Argeș Pitești players
FC Unirea Urziceni players
CSM Ceahlăul Piatra Neamț players
CS Mioveni players
Romanian football managers